Rose Flanders Bascom, born in Contoocook (a village of Hopkinton), Merrimack County, New Hampshire in 1880, was the first American woman lion tamer, who performed in the circus in the early 1900s.

In 1898 she married Alfred Bascom who was of French Canadian ancestry but born in the United States. About 1905, Rose joined the circus life and became a lion tamer.

It is reported that she was clawed by a lion resulting in an infection that led to her untimely death around the year of 1915. She left behind her husband and their young daughter Agnes.

References

1880 births
1915 deaths
American circus performers
Lion tamers
People from Hopkinton, New Hampshire
Deaths due to lion attacks